Hull Island is an island in the Central Coast region of British Columbia, Canada, located in Havannah Channel to the east of the southern end of East Cracroft Island.

Name origin
The island was named c.1860 by Captain Richards of the Royal Navy, for Thomas Arthur Hull, ship's master of  under Captain Thomas Harvey, namesake of Port Harvey which is just to the west, forming a bay between the two nearly-joined Cracroft Islands.  Havannah served on the Pacific Station from 1855 to 1859.

See also
List of islands of British Columbia

References

Islands of British Columbia
Central Coast of British Columbia